Ma Keyao (born June 1932) is a Chinese historian who is a professor and doctoral supervisor at Peking University.

Biography
Ma was born in Wenshui County, Shanxi, in June 1932. In 1952 he entered Peking University, where he majored in history. After graduating in 1956, he taught at the university. He was promoted to full professor in 1985. He served as director of the Department of History from 1986 to 1992.

Works

References

External links
MaKeyao on Peking University

1932 births
Living people
People from Wenshui County
Chinese historians
Peking University alumni
Academic staff of Peking University